Fareed Nawaz Baloch (Sindhi: فريد نواز بلوچ), also spelt as Farid Nawaz Balouch, was a Pakistani television and radio artist.

Early life 
Fareed Nawaz Baloch was born on 9 September 1946 at Hyderabad, Sindh, Pakistan. His father Rais Khan Muhammad Nuhani died before his birth. Young Fareed Nawaz was brought up by his uncle Rais Ghulam Qadir Noohani baloch. Educationist Mariyam Sultana Noohani baloch  was his cousin. After graduation, he served in Chambers of Commerce Hyderabad.

Acting career 
Fareed Nawas started his acting career at Radio Pakistan Hyderabad. Later on, he was introduced on Pakistan television by Abdul Karim Baloch. Farid Nawaz had more than 100 TV plays to his credit. He appeared in many TV drama serials including Dewarain and Jungle.

Urdu plays and serials 

 Aaj Kay Afsanay (Urdu: آج کے افسانے)
 Deewaren (Urdu:  دیواریں)
 Do Suraj (Urdu: دو سورج)
 Hawaian (Urdu: ہوائیں)
 Jangloos (Urdu: جانگلوس) 
 Jungle (Urdu:  جنگل)
 Suraj Grahan (Urdu: چاند گرہن)

Sindhi plays and serials 
He acted in sindhi plays and serials of ptv. These include:

 Baakh (Sindhi: باک)
 Dunya Deemani (Sindhi: دنيا ديواني)
 Karo Kari (Sindhi: ڪاروڪاري)
 Milkyat (Sindhi: ملڪيت)
 Nibero (Sindhi: نبيرو)
 Rania Ji Kahani (Sindhi: راڻيءَ جي ڪھاڻي)
 Zeenat (Sindhi: زينت)

Death 
Farid Nawaz Baloch died on 15 December 2001 in Karachi. He left behind a wife, three sons and one daughter to mourn his death along with thousands of well wishers.

References 

1946 births
2001 deaths
Sindhi people
Pakistani male television actors
20th-century Pakistani male actors
People from Hyderabad, Sindh